Wang Tao (王涛, colloquially known as Big Wang Tao 大王涛 ; born 1967) is a Chinese football player who played for Beijing Guoan F.C. and for the China national football team from 1990 until 1995.

References

1967 births
Chinese footballers
Living people
Place of birth missing (living people)
Footballers at the 1990 Asian Games
Association footballers not categorized by position
Asian Games competitors for China